Silver Creek is a former settlement in Plumas County, California. It lay at an elevation of 3724 feet (1135 m).

History
Silver Creek was the home to the largest Chinese settlement of Plumas County, with over 500 residents, which lasted from about 1855 to the 1920s. It became the commercial center for the county's Chinese, with hotels, restaurants, stores, worship and social places. The land surrounding the town was later dredged away, leaving only a few remnants to see today.

References

Former populated places in California
Former settlements in Plumas County, California